Line 6 of the Changsha Metro is a rapid transit line in Changsha, Hunan, China. The line opened on 28 June 2022, running  with 34 stations.

History
Construction started on 28 December 2016. Test operations without passengers started in December 2021. Phase 1 of Line 6 opened on 28 June 2022.

Opening timeline

Rolling stock 
The line is operated using six-car Type A trains manufactured by CRRC Zhuzhou Locomotive, with a capacity for 2592 passengers. The maximum service speed of the trains is 80 km/h.

Stations

References

Changsha Metro lines
2022 establishments in China